The Drottningholm Palace is the private residence of the Swedish royal family. Drottningholm is near the capital Stockholm. Built on the island Lovön (in Ekerö Municipality of Stockholm County), it is one of Sweden's Royal Palaces. It was originally built in the late 16th century, and it served as a regular summer residence of the Swedish royal court for most of the 18th century. Apart from being the private residence of the Swedish royal family, the palace is a popular tourist attraction.

History

Origin
The name Drottningholm (literally meaning "Queen's islet") came from the original renaissance building designed by Willem Boy, a stone palace built by John III of Sweden in 1580 for his queen, Catherine Jagiellon.  This palace was preceded by a royal mansion called Torvesund.

The Queen Dowager Regent Hedwig Eleonora bought the castle throughout 1661, a year after her role as Queen of Sweden ended, but it burnt to the ground on 30 December that same year. Hedwig Eleonora engaged the architect Nicodemus Tessin the Elder to design and rebuild the castle. In 1662, work began on the reconstruction of the building. With the castle almost complete, Nicodemus died in 1681. His son Nicodemus Tessin the Younger continued his work and completed the elaborate interior designs.  The Flemish sculptor Nicolaes Millich made for the great staircase and hall sculptures of the nine muses in marble, along with a series of busts of Gothic kings.   In addition, he also made bust portraits of King Charles X Gustav, his wife Hedwig Eleonor and both their sons, the young King Charles XI, probably also of Magnus Gabriel De la Gardie and his wife Maria Euphrosyne, a sister of King Charles X Gustav. Millich and his assistant Burchard Precht also made decorative wood carvings in the queen dowager's bed chamber.

During the period of the reconstruction, Hedwig Eleonora was head of the regency for the still-underage King, Charles XI of Sweden, from 1660 to 1672. Sweden had grown to be a powerful country after the Peace of Westphalia. The position of the queen, essentially the ruler of Sweden, demanded an impressive residence located conveniently close to Stockholm.

During the reign of the kings Charles XI of Sweden and Charles XII of Sweden, the royal court was often present at the palace, which was used for hunting. Hedwig Eleonora used the palace as a summer residence until her death in 1715, also when she had become the undisputed host of the royal court during the absence of Charles XII in Great Northern War (1700–1721).

18th century
Drottningholm continued to serve regularly as a summer residence for the royal court during the entire 18th-century. After the death of Hedwig Eleonora in 1715, Queen Ulrika Eleonora of Sweden and King Frederick I of Sweden held court at the palace in the summer.

In 1744, the palace was given as a gift from King Frederick I to the then Crown Princess, later Queen of Sweden, Louisa Ulrika of Prussia when she married Adolf Frederick of Sweden, who became King of Sweden in 1751. During Louisa Ulrika's ownership of Drottningholm the interior of the palace was transformed into a more sophisticated French rococo style. Louisa Ulrika was also responsible for having the Drottningholm Palace Theatre rebuilt in a grand style after the more modest original building burnt down in 1762. Louisa Ulrika and Adolf Fredrick continued to reside at the palace during their reign (1751–1771). In 1777, Louisa Ulrika sold Drottningholm to the Swedish state.

While it was owned by the Swedish state, the palace was used by King Gustav III of Sweden, son of Louisa Ulrika, as a summer residence, and a grand ceremonial court life was performed at the palace, which is considered to have been a great age for the palace, during which it was known for the elaborate masquerades and grand theatrical festivities and tournaments performed in the gardens.  During the reign of Gustav IV Adolf of Sweden (reign 1792–1809) and Charles XIII of Sweden (reign 1809–1818) the palace was gradually used more sporadically. In 1797, it was the place of the great festivities when the King's bride, Frederica of Baden, was received there upon her arrival in Sweden, during which the last so called carousel, or tournament, was staged in the palace garden. After the Coup of 1809, the deposed Gustav IV Adolf was kept here under guard in the Chinese Drawing Room for eleven days.

19th century

During the reign of Charles XIV John of Sweden (reign 1818–1844), the palace was abandoned. The King regarded it as a symbol of the old dynasty, and Drottningholm was left to decay. The buildings were damaged by the forces of nature, and their inventories were either taken away or auctioned off.

It was apparently opened to the public for the first time during this period: a tour was mentioned in 1819, and the public used the park for picnics.
Occasionally, the grounds were used for public events: in 1823, the bride of the crown prince, Josephine of Leuchtenberg, was received upon her arrival to Sweden, and her name day continued to be celebrated here. Foreign guests were received in the palace gardens, such as Tsar Nicholas I of Russia.

Oscar I of Sweden took an interest in the palace, and though he preferred Tullgarn Palace as summer residence, he took care to preserve the palace by doing the first repairs in 1846. He further more used it for public celebrations, such as a reception for Pan-Scandinavian students in 1856, and in 1858, the future Gustav V of Sweden was born in the palace. Charles XV of Sweden preferred Ulriksdal Palace as his summer residence and ignored Drottningholm, but Oscar II of Sweden continued the repairs.

Both Oscar I and Oscar II were criticized for modernizing the palace and adjusting it to contemporary fashion rather than restoring it to its original state, and it was not until the reign of Gustav V that the palace and surroundings were reconstructed to their 18th-century appearance. In 1907, a major four-year restoration of the palace was begun to restore it to its former state, after which the royal court began to use it regularly again.

Royal residence
The current Swedish royal family have used the west-wing Drottningholm as their primary residence since 1981. Since then, the Palace has also been guarded by the Swedish Military in the same fashion as Stockholm Palace. The other parts of the Palace are open to the public.

The palace
The palace and its grounds have seen many renovations, changes and additions over the past 400 years. The largest renovation, in which electricity, heating, sewage, water lines were either  installed or updated and the castle roof replaced, took place between 1907 and 1913.
During a 20-year-period beginning around 1977, several major areas of the palace were restored and rebuilt. The library and national hall received much of the attention and fire protection was installed throughout the palace. In 1997, work began to clean and rebuild the exterior walls. This was completed in 2002.

The palace church
The church was designed and erected by Nicodemus Tessin the Elder. It was completed by his son in May, 1746.

It is still used by the people of Lovön parish, who worship in the church on the last Sunday of every month. Inside the castle church a Cahman organ from 1730 is still in use. Another noteworthy item is the traditional church tapestry which was made by Gustaf V of Sweden.

The palace theatre
 

The Drottningholm Palace Theatre is the opera house located at the palace. It is still in use, and its summer opera festivals are quite popular. At times the Royal Swedish Opera company guest performs.

The Chinese Pavilion

The Chinese Pavilion, located on the grounds of the Drottningholm Palace park, is a Chinese-inspired royal pavilion built in 1763–1770.

The gardens

The gardens and park areas surrounding the castle and its buildings are one of the main attractions for the tourists that visit the palace each year. The gardens have been established in stages since the castle was built, resulting in different styles of parks and gardens.

The Baroque garden
The oldest part of the gardens was created at the end of the 17th century under the direction of Hedwig Eleonora. The father and son Tessin led the project that created a Baroque garden right outside the main palace, flanked by thick tree avenues. The many statues scattered throughout this area were created by the artist Adrian de Vries; the Swedish army took them as spoils of war from the Wallenstein Palace in Prague, while the two marble lions at the main gate of the palace were transported from the Ujazdów Castle in Warsaw. The Baroque garden was neglected along with the rest of the grounds during the 19th century, but was restored in the 1950s and 1960s on the initiative of Gustaf VI Adolf of Sweden.

The English garden

Gustav III of Sweden took the initiative for the English landscape garden of Drottningholm. This lies north of the Baroque garden and consists of two ponds with canals, bridges, large open lawns, and trees in groups or avenues. Walkways are laid out throughout this large part of the park.

Throughout this area "vistas" can be seen, cleared lines of sight that are intentionally constructed to draw the eye to a particular view. Most of the antique marble statues throughout the gardens were purchased by Gustav III from Italy. The purpose of the statues is to surprise a visitor by their unexpected appearance in a green area, or as a focal point for a vista.

UNESCO World Heritage Site
The palace is a UNESCO World Heritage Site, mainly because of the Drottningholm Palace Theatre and the Chinese Pavilion. It was added to the list in 1991. The UNESCO comments were:

Gallery

See also
 List of Baroque residences

References

External links 

 Official website
 Drottningholm Palace park's 360x180 degree panorama virtual tour at stockholm360.net

Drottningholm Palace
World Heritage Sites in Sweden